Emilio Villalba Welsh (died 7 September 1992) was a prolific Argentine screenwriter.

Welsh wrote the scripts for almost 50 films between 1943 and 1987 including the script for the 1954 Román Viñoly Barreto film The Grandfather which starred actors such as Enrique Muino and Mecha Ortiz.

Welsh appeared as a member of the jury at the 16th Berlin International Film Festival in 1966.

Selected filmography
 El Abuelo (1954)
 Dance of Fire (1949)
 Juan Mondiola (1950)

References

External links
 

Male screenwriters
Year of birth missing
1992 deaths
20th-century Argentine screenwriters
20th-century Argentine male writers